Coalhurst (originally named Bridgend) is a town in southern Alberta, Canada. It used to be a coal-mining community.

Around 1930, a large fire broke out in Coalhurst and cost the town about $35,000. No one was injured in the fire.

Demographics 

In the 2016 Census of Population conducted by Statistics Canada, the Town of Coalhurst recorded a population of 2,668 living in 938 of its 970 total private dwellings, a  change from its 2011 population of 1,978.

See also 
List of communities in Alberta
List of towns in Alberta

References

External links 

1913 establishments in Alberta
1936 disestablishments in Alberta
1979 establishments in Alberta
Lethbridge County
Towns in Alberta